The Indochinese leopard (Panthera pardus delacouri) is a leopard subspecies native to mainland Southeast Asia and southern China. In Indochina, leopards are rare outside protected areas and threatened by habitat loss due to deforestation as well as poaching for the illegal wildlife trade. The population trend is suspected to be decreasing. As of 2016, the population is thought to comprise 973–2,503 mature individuals, with only 409–1,051 breeding adults. The historical range has decreased by more than 90%.

Taxonomy 
Panthera pardus delacouri was described in 1930 by Reginald Innes Pocock based on a leopard skin from Annam.

Characteristics 

Pocock described an Indochinese leopard skin as almost rusty-red in ground colour but paler at the sides. It had small rosettes that were mostly  in diameter and so closely set that it looked dark. He commented to have seen only black leopards from Johor and other areas in the Malay Peninsula exhibited in menageries. He therefore assumed that the proportion of black leopards increases farther south.

Records from camera trapping studies conducted at 22 locations in southern Thailand and peninsular Malaysia between 1996 and 2009 show that Indochinese leopards recorded north of the Kra Isthmus are predominantly spotted. South of the Isthmus, only melanistic leopards were recorded. Melanism is quite common in dense tropical forest habitat, and black leopards are thought to have a selective advantage for ambush.

Distribution and habitat 
The Indochinese leopard is distributed in Southeast Asia, where today small populations remain only in Myanmar, Thailand, Malaysia, Cambodia, and southern China. In Laos, Vietnam and Singapore it is suspected to have been extirpated. Peninsular Malaysia and the Northern Tenasserim Forest Complex on the Thailand-Myanmar border are at present considered strongholds, and eastern Cambodia a priority site.

In Myanmar's Chatthin Wildlife Sanctuary, the leopard population declined so drastically between the 1940s and 1980s, that by 2000 it was estimated as being close to locally extinct.
In 2015, leopards were recorded for the first time by camera traps in the hill forests of Karen State.

In Thailand, the Indochinese leopard is present in the Western Forest Complex, Kaeng Krachan-Kui Buri and Khlong Saeng-Khao Sok protected area complexes. But since the turn of the 21st century, it has not been recorded any more in the northern and south-central forest complexes of the country. 
In Hala Bala Wildlife Sanctuary on the Thai-Malaysian border, only two leopards walked past camera traps deployed between October 2004 and October 2007.

In Malaysia, the leopard is present in Belum-Temengor, Taman Negara and Endau-Rompin National Parks.
In April 2010, a spotted leopard was seen in a camera trap in Taman Negara National Park, where previously only black leopards were thought to occur. It has also been recorded in secondary forests in Selangor and Johor states.

Leopards are reported to occur in Nam Kan National Protected Area as well.

In Cambodia, leopards were recorded in deciduous dipterocarp forest in Phnom Prich Wildlife Sanctuary between December 2008 and August 2009, and in Sre Pok Wildlife Sanctuary in 2009 and 2014.

In southern China, camera trap surveys were conducted in 11 nature reserves between 2002 and 2009, but leopards were only recorded in Changqing National Nature Reserve in the Qinling Mountains.

Ecology and behaviour 
Since the mid-1980s, leopard-oriented field research was carried out in three protected areas in Thailand:
Between 1985 and 1986, leopard scats were collected in an evergreen dipterocarp mountain forest in Chiang Mai Province of northwestern Thailand. Prey species found in scats comprised foremost Indian muntjac, followed by wild boar, long-tailed goral, dusky leaf monkey, Malayan porcupine, and Indian hog deer only in the hot season from February to April.
 In 1996, three leopards were fitted with radio collars in the south–central part of Kaeng Krachan National Park, a hilly terrain with seasonal evergreen forest. Both male leopards slightly extended their home range during the wet season of June to October. Red muntjac, Malayan porcupine and gaur are the most abundant potential prey species in this protected area.
 Between 1994 and 1999, ten leopards were fitted with radio collars in the northwestern part of Huai Kha Khaeng Wildlife Sanctuary and followed over 9–41 months. All leopards preferred dry evergreen and mixed deciduous forest with flat slope near water courses.

Wild boar, macaque and lesser mouse deer were identified as the main potential prey species for the leopard in a highly fragmented secondary forest in Malaysia's Selangor area.

Threats 
There are few contiguous areas left where leopards have a chance of long-term survival. They are primarily threatened by habitat destruction following large–scale deforestation, and prey depletion through illegal hunting.

An increasingly growing threat is hunting for the illegal wildlife trade, which is showing its potential to do maximum harm in minimal time: leopards are increasingly being used as substitutes for tiger parts in traditional Chinese medicine, with the price of leopard parts rising as tiger parts become scarce.

Habitat destruction 
Human traffic inside protected areas negatively affects leopard movements and activity. They show less diurnal activity in areas more heavily used by people. In villages located in Laos' protected areas, local people consume about  meat of deer and wild boar annually per household. This offtake amounts to  ungulates per , which is equivalent to the meat required to sustain several leopards per .

In a highly fragmented tropical rain forest within Malaysia's capital agglomeration of Klang Valley leopard density has been estimated at 28.35 individuals per , which is one of the highest leopard densities reported. As a result of rapid shrinking of the forests, individuals may have been pushed into the remaining forest in this area, so that their population is unexpectedly high. Leopards were mostly affected by construction activities conducted inside the forest.

Illegal wildlife trade 
Substantial domestic skin markets exist in Myanmar, in Malaysia for traditional medicines, and in China for skins and bones, the latter particularly as a substitute for the tiger in traditional Asian medicines and tonics. In China, the use of stockpiles of leopard bone is still permitted by the government by medicinal manufacturers, despite the domestic trade ban.

In Myanmar, 215 body parts of at least 177 leopards were observed in four markets surveyed between 1991 and 2006. Among the body parts, a leopard penis and testes were openly traded, along with other parts of freshly killed animals. Three of the surveyed markets are situated on international borders with China and Thailand, and attract international buyers, although leopards are completely protected under Myanmar's national legislation. Effective implementation and enforcement of CITES is considered inadequate.

In early 2018, the carcass of a black leopard was discovered in Thailand's Thung Yai Naresuan Wildlife Sanctuary, along with other animals. They were in the possession of a businessman who presided over the construction company Italian-Thai Development.

See also 

Leopard subspecies
Chinese leopard
Zanzibar leopard

References

External links 
 Leopards .:. wild-cat.org — Information about leopard research and conservation
 Asian Leopard Specialist Society, Iran
 Rare Spotted Leopard Photographed for First Time in Malaysian National Park (Photo)
 Cambodia’s leopards are on the brink of extinction

Leopards
Mammals described in 1930
Carnivorans of Malaysia
Mammals of Myanmar
Mammals of Cambodia
Mammals of Laos
Mammals of Vietnam
Mammals of Thailand
Fauna of Yunnan